USS Monadnock may refer to:

, was a double-turret monitor commissioned in October 1864 and decommissioned June 1866
, was an  commissioned in September 1883 and decommissioned March 1919
, was acquired by the US Navy in June 1941 and sold in 1949
, was acquired by the US Navy in March 1951 and removed from the Navy List in July 1960

United States Navy ship names